Media, War & Conflict is a peer-reviewed academic journal that covers the intersection of international relations and media studies. The journal publishes four issues per year. The editors-in-chief are Sarah Maltby (University of Sussex), Ben O'Loughlin (Royal Holloway University), Katy Parry (University of Leeds), and Laura Roselle (Elon University). It was established in 2008 and is published by SAGE Publications.

Abstracting and indexing
Journal indexing and metrics can be found on the SAGE website: https://journals.sagepub.com/metrics/MWC

External links
 

SAGE Publishing academic journals
English-language journals
International relations journals
Media studies journals
Publications established in 2008
Triannual journals